High Flight is a 1957, CinemaScope, American, cold war children’s film in Technicolor, directed by John Gilling and featuring Ray Milland, Bernard Lee and Leslie Phillips. High Flight was filmed with the co-operation of the Royal Air Force (RAF). The title of the film was derived from the poem of the same title by Pilot Officer John Gillespie Magee, Jr., an American aviator who flew for the Royal Canadian Air Force (RCAF) and lost his life in 1941 over RAF Cranwell, where much of the film was shot.

Plot
A group of flight cadets arrive at RAF Cranwell to begin a three-year training course to become RAF pilots. Amongst the group is Tony Winchester (Kenneth Haigh) who makes a memorable entrance by landing his civilian Taylorcraft Auster aircraft with his girlfriend (Anne Aubrey) aboard on the RAF runway just ahead of a de Havilland Vampire jet trainer piloted by Wing Commander Rudge (Ray Milland).

During the Second World War, Winchester's father had been Rudge's commanding officer and was killed protecting Rudge, who had disobeyed orders. Winchester is a difficult individual who harbours animosity towards Rudge over his father's death. Another of the aspiring pilots is the scientific minded Roger Endicott (Anthony Newley) who is also determined to create a working flying saucer. Endicott's flying radio-controlled model develops difficulties and crashes into the middle of a Bishop's (Ian Fleming) tea party.

Winchester doesn't learn the meaning of teamwork and is nearly killed when he disobeys orders, flying into a storm. Rudge demands his resignation but reconsiders, remembering his own rash behaviour had been the cause of the death of Winchester's father. Rudge ultimately selects Winchester to fly in a precision aerial team training for the Farnborough Airshow. When the squadron is temporarily posted to a forward base in West Germany, Winchester flies close to hostile territory near the inner-German border and is nearly shot down by East German anti-aircraft guns firing across the border. The wounded airman and his stricken aircraft are rescued by Rudge, who brings him back safely to a crash landing at his home base. Finally, Winchester comes to understand his role in the RAF and that he is part of a team effort.

Cast
As appearing in screen credits (main roles identified):

Production
Irving Allen and Albert Broccoli commissioned Jack Davies to write a screenplay about the present day Royal Air Force. Davies visited various RAF stations in Britain and Germany as well as the RAF College at Cranwell. "To say that I was impressed with what I saw and learnt was an understatement", said Davies. "These young men who fly daily at supersonic speeds are the flower of our youth. They work hard and they play hard." Ken Hughes worked on the script

Photography was originally scheduled around No. 111 Squadron RAF, nicknamed "Treble One" or "Tremblers", stationed at RAF Wattisham. The squadron was in the process of, or had been recently selected as the Royal Air Force Fighter Command Aerobatics Display Team, which became known as the Black Arrows. Film of the team at the 1956 Farnborough Airshow was featured. When inclement weather interrupted filming at their home base, the production moved to RAF Leuchars in Fife. Scotland, base of No. 43 Squadron RAF. RAF Leuchars later stood in for RAF Wunsdorf in West Germany. Principal photography which began on 10 April 1957, also took place at RAF Cranwell, Lincolnshire, using not only the facility but also film of the graduating ceremony of a training course, as well as RAF Chivenor, Devon, United Kingdom.

The use of RAF Percival Provost piston and de Havilland Vampire T.11 jet training aircraft and operational Hawker Hunter fighter aircraft heightened the authenticity of the film. During the course of production at RAF Leuchars, a Hunter "wheeled up" which allowed the film crew to use the wreck to simulate a Hunter crash. When the RAF did not allow the film crew to use an operational airframe as a camera aircraft, one Hunter was converted into a "PR" version, specially modified at great cost, to carry a forward-facing Cinemascope camera. A screen was drawn on the front windscreen of the camera Hunter with a chinagraph crayon. The pilot was instructed to fill the windscreen with aircraft. Additional air-to-air shots were taken from an Avro Lincoln bomber. Other aircraft visible in the film include Handley Page Hastings transport aircraft and Bristol Sycamore helicopters.

The casting of Ray Milland was typical of the Warwick Films productions, in using the star power of an American actor but in the case of Milland, he was also well suited to the film and its subject matter. During the 1930s and into the 1940s, the Welsh-born actor had moved to Hollywood and during the Second World War, had served as a civilian instructor for the United States Army Air Forces.

Reception
The film had a Gala World Premiere on 12 September 1957 at the Empire, Leicester Square. Released in England during Battle of Britain Week, High Flight did not fare well with critics. The film was a commercial success, leading to a studio re-release in 1961. The authoritative Flight magazine noted that the aviation theme dominated, with 40 minutes of film time devoted to flying sequences. Later reviewers commented that the film was "... well written and acted. Lots of authentic jet flying sequences". Leonard Maltin indicated " (a) stale British drama of recruits in training for the RAF ... Last reel, in the air, (was the) only exciting part."

Home video release
Although rarely seen on television and at times the US version, only in black and white, is broadcast, a DVD in colour is now available.

See also
 List of American films of 1957

References

Notes

Citations

Bibliography

 Granfield, Linda. High Flight: A Story of World War II. Toronto, Ontario: Tundra Books, 1999. .
 Hardwick, Jack and Ed Schnepf. "A Viewer's Guide to Aviation Movies." The Making of the Great Aviation Films, General Aviation Series, Volume 2, 1989.
 Mackenzie, S.P. British War Films, 1939–1945: The Cinema and the Services. New York: Continuum International Publishing Group, 2001. .
 Paris, Michael. From the Wright Brothers to Top gun: Aviation, Nationalism, and Popular Cinema. Manchester, UK: Manchester University Press, 1995. .

External links
 
 

1957 films
British war drama films
British aviation films
Cold War aviation films
Columbia Pictures films
CinemaScope films
Films directed by John Gilling
Films produced by Ian Dalrymple
Films scored by Douglas Gamley
Films set in West Germany
Films set in Lincolnshire
Films shot in Scotland
Films shot in Suffolk
Films shot in Lincolnshire
Films shot in Fife
1950s English-language films
1950s British films